The following is a list of Kansas Jayhawks football seasons including the coaches in each season and competition scores and rankings from 1890 to present day. The sports teams at the University of Kansas (KU), in Lawrence, Kansas, are known as the Jayhawks. When the University of Kansas fielded their first football team in 1890, the team was called the Jayhawkers.

Yearly results

 Controversy surrounded the end of the season, however, as Kansas was found to have fielded an ineligible player, Bert Coan, in their games against Colorado and Missouri. The Big 8 Conference considers those games to be forfeits by Kansas, though Kansas and the NCAA recognize Kansas' on-field victories. The forfeited games remain a topic of dispute in the Border War.

References

Kansas Jayhawks
Kansas Jayhawks football seasons